The JW Marriott, Kuala Lumpur is a hotel of the Marriott Hotel Group in Kuala Lumpur's central business district. It is 23 stories tall with 491 rooms, 20 meeting rooms-  of total meeting space.

History
YTL Corporation bought over the Kuala Lumpur JW Marriott hotel and two other properties in Kuala Lumpur  through its subsidiary, YTL Land in 2005. The total purchase price was $85 million (RM323 million).

Location
The JW Marriott Hotel is located in Kuala Lumpur's Golden Triangle.

References

JW Marriott Hotels
Skyscraper hotels in Kuala Lumpur
Hotels established in 1997
Hotel buildings completed in 1997
1997 establishments in Malaysia